The anchored cross, or mariner's cross, is a stylized cross in the shape of an anchor. It is a symbol which is shaped like a plus sign depicted with anchor-like fluke protrusions at its base. There are many variations on this symbol, but the most common form connects a ring with a bar, with a cross-bar, terminating on the other end with two curved branches or arrowheads. The anchor symbolizes hope, steadfastness, calm and composure. It also can symbolize security in one or more uncertain experiences of life, such as sea voyages, one's fate after death, and the vagaries of fortune.

Background
The anchor cross may be referred to as the "Cross of Hope," a concept dating back to (and perhaps before) Hebrews 6.19: "Which hope we have as an anchor of the soul, both sure and steadfast, and which entereth into that within the veil."  

The use of the anchor as a symbol has been attributed to Seleucus I. The symbol was then adopted by the Jews living in the Seleucid Empire on their coinage. Therefore, the anchor as a symbol would have been widespread and familiar to early Christians. Inscriptions found in the catacomb of St. Domitilla dating back to the 1st century CE use the anchor as a symbol. The anchor is thus one of the oldest symbols used in Christianity, and in this instance it is combined with the cross, representing Jesus. Clement of Alexandria is said to have approved the use of the anchor as a symbol because of its use in scripture. Hebrews 6.19 ties the anchor to the concept of "hope," and thus Christians' hope of salvation through Christ.

Missionaries of the United Methodist Church wear the anchor cross as a reminder that their work should always be "anchored in faith, hope and love".

The region of Camargue in France created their own symbol, made to represent the "" of herdsmen and fishermen, and the three theological virtues of Christianity. It has the same elements as an anchored cross:   
a cross anchory with the three fleur-de-lis replaced by camargue tridents representing Christian faith;
an anchor representing hope; along with
 the heart of The Three Marys representing charity

St. Clement's Cross
The anchored cross is also referred to as the mariner's cross or St. Clement's Cross, in reference to the way he was supposedly martyred – tied to an anchor and thrown from a boat into the Black Sea. Despite this tradition of his untimely end at sea, Clement is considered a patron saint of sailors, and many wear his cross for protection.

In heraldry
The anchored cross is a feature in coats of arms, and flags, in which context it is referred to by the heraldic terms "anchry" or "ancre."

Gallery

See also
 Crosses in heraldry

References

External links

Cross symbols